Lee Young-you (born April 11, 1977, in Seoul, South Korea) is a female creator of Korean manhwa. Several of her series have been translated into English and released in the United States.

Works
Kill Me, Kiss Me
Moon Boy
Priceless
Pastel Green Spell
Siesta
Spring Spring

References 

South Korean manhwa artists
South Korean manhwa writers
Living people
1977 births
People from Seoul
South Korean women artists
South Korean female comics artists
Female comics writers